Tom Wallisch (born July 22, 1987 in Pittsburgh, Pennsylvania) is a professional freeskier.

Early life and education 
Wallisch began skiing in 1990 and competing in the sport in 2009.  After graduating from high school, Wallisch moved to Salt Lake City for post-secondary education at the University of Utah where he is pursuing a degree in the school of business.

Professional skiing career 
Wallisch was discovered when he entered and subsequently won the 2007 Level 1 SuperUnknown video contest. The video was produced by 4Bi9 Media. He pioneered the trend of becoming famous in free skiing by posting videos of his skills online. Typically, fame is achieved in the sport by winning competitions. Reversing this trend, however, Wallisch achieved success in competitions after becoming famous through video parts.

At Winter X Games XVI, Wallisch won gold in the Slopestyle event.

Wallisch is well regarded for his smooth yet complex spins and composed style. Known for being an early adopter of extremely baggy (XXL+) ski clothing as a fashion statement, Wasllisch is also credited with popularizing the concept of "Afterbang." This is a highly-stylized and rigid leaning pose assumed immediately after landing a trick, which is sometimes attributed to the dance move showcased in rapper Fat Joe's 2004 mega-hit Lean Back. Both of these trends were borne out of greater Hip Hop culture.

Wallisch is only the third skier in history to win Powder's coveted Reader Poll and the second to take it back-to-back (2011, 2012). He joins only Shane McConkey and Seth Morrison in taking the honor. He has also won Freeskier Magazine's Skier of the Year award (2010, 2012), receiving 30,000 fan votes on Freeskier.com.

The 2012 season is considered to be Wallisch's breakout competition season. He won gold at the X Games, won the Killington Dew Tour, finished second at European X Games in France, and finished second at the Dew Tour stop at Snowbasin. Wallisch also won the title for the overall Dew Tour Dew Cup and was named the 2012 Men's Slopestyle World Champion.

After years of filming with 4Bi9 Media and Level 1 Productions, Wallisch created a solo film project with cinematographer Kyle Decker for the 2012/2013 season, titled "The Wallisch Project."

In the 2013-2014 season, Wallisch tore his ACL and was unable to qualify for the Sochi Olympics. The short film "Skier's Discretion" (4Bi9 Media) explained the injury and Wallisch's attempts to qualify for the games. Also during the 2013-2014 Olympic season, Wallisch was featured in a Vice Documentary on the sport of Freeskiing.

For the 2014-2015 ski season, Wallisch switched from his previous ski and goggle sponsor, Scott Sports, to Shred Optics and LINE Skis. Wallisch also shifted his primary focus from competitions to park and urban filming. Wallisch films primarily with the ski content production house "Good Company."

In 2016, Wallisch set a world record with a 424-foot rail grind, surpassing Simen Gjelsvik's previous record of 405 feet.

Tom has a notable release of his Pro Model, the Tom Wallisch Pro from Line Skis which has received rave reviews from the Park-focused media.

Notable competition results

 2nd, Winter X Games, Tignes, 2012 (slopestyle)
 3rd, Winter X Games, Aspen 2012 (slopestyle)
 1st, Dew Tour stop #1, Killington, 2012 (slopestyle)
 1st, Dew Tour stop #1, Breckenridge, 2011 (slopestyle)
 1st, Winter X Games, Tignes, 2010 (slopestyle)
 3rd, Dumont Cup, 2010 (slopestyle)
 1st, Dew Tour stop #2, 2010 (slopestyle)
 2nd, AFP Year End, 2010 (slopestyle)
 2nd, Dew Tour stop #1, Breckenridge, 2009 (slopestyle)
 1st, Winter Games NZ, 2009 (slopestyle)
 2nd, New Zealand Open, 2009 (slopestyle)
 1st, Dumont Cup, 2009 (slopestyle)
 2nd, European Open, 2009 (slopestyle)
 1st, Dew Tour stop #3, Northstar, 2009 (slopestyle)
 1st, AFP Year End, 2009 (slopestyle)
 1st, Ryan Lichtenberg Memorial 2006 (Rail Jam)
 Rated as ESPN´S Athlete of the year 2012
 3x Powder Magazine's Reader Poll Athlete of the Year (2011, 2012, & 2013)

See also
 Freeskiing
 Newschool Skiing

References

External links
 
 

American freeskiers
Sportspeople from Pittsburgh
1987 births
Living people
American male freestyle skiers
X Games athletes
Olympic Games broadcasters